Oragadam is an industrial suburb of Chennai, India. The locality, known as the biggest automobile hub in South Asia, is one of the fastest-growing suburbs of Chennai and is evolving into a multi-faceted industrial zone.

Industries
Oragadam has been touted as Chennai's largest and the most developed industrial belt. With over 22 Fortune 500 companies (of which six are global car manufacturers), the Sriperumbudur–Oragadam belt has seen tremendous industrial growth in less than 4 years. The area is well-connected via road and rail, and according to industrial experts, the presence of automobile giants like Renault-Nissan, Royal Enfield and Ford has triggered growth around Oragadam. Several manufacturing giants such as Motorola, Dell, Flextronics, Samsung,  Apollo Tyres, and TVS Electronics, Yamaha have set up their respective units in the industrial belt stretching from Sriperumbudur to Oragadam. In addition, JCBL Ltd, Essar Steel, BPCL, Delphi TVS Diesel Systems Ltd, GE Bayer, Silicons (India) Pvt Ltd have also set up their businesses in SIPCOT Industrial Park, Oragadam. DHL is also reported to be setting up its first Free Trade Warehousing Zone at Sriperumbudur.

The town is known for its various industries and workshops pertaining to the automobile sector. Oragadam along with Sriperumbudur has seen major investments from foreign companies in recent times. Oragadam will soon become one of the largest Automobile hubs in the world. International Automobile majors like Daimler AG, Renault–Nissan, Komatsu have set up their car manufacturing plants here and will use it as a base for sourcing for their international markets, apart from supplying to meet the fast-growing Indian market. One of the otiose  Clubs "The Chennai Corporate Club" is also located nearby.

The Tamil Nadu government is building the Rs. 300 crores Oragadam Industrial Corridor Road. The project, executed by the Tamil Nadu Road Infrastructure Development Corporation (TNRIDC) and funded through the State Highways Department, is expected to give a thrust to industrial activity in the Oragadam-Sriperumbudur cluster. It will also provide additional connectivity between Grand Southern Trunk Road (GST Road i.e. National Highway 45) and Grand Western Trunk Road (National Highway 4).

Companies based in Oragadam and neighboring areas include Apollo Tyres, Allison Transmission, Asian Paints Limited, Bosch India, Daimler India Commercial vehicles, Delphi-TVS Diesel Systems Limited, India Yamaha Motor, Mindarika Private Limited (Indo Japanese Joint Venture Company), Nokia Siemens Networks, Nissan, Nokia SEZ, Renault Nissan Automotive India, Royal Enfield
and Sandhar Technologies Ltd.

Educational institutions in and around Oragadam
 Xavier Institute of Management and Entrepreneurship, Chennai
 Agathiya Matriculation Higher Secondary School, Walajabad up to 12th Std
 Little Flower Hr Sec School – Theraesapuram
 Monford CBSC School Up to Vth STD – Theraesapuram
 Apollo Priyadarashanam Polytechnic College
 Sri Krishna Engineering College - Located at Panapakkam
 Dhaanish Ahamed college of Engineering - Located at vanchuvanchery
 Raasi College of Engineering - Located at vanchuvanchery
 P.S. TempleGreen Vidhyashram (CBSE)at the ArunExcello's TempleGreen project. Mathur post, Oragadam.
 Thriveni Academy (CBSE) at the Evita Constructions Pvt Ltd Hiranandani Park, Thriveni Nagar (Vadakku Pattu)
 Thirumagal Polytechnic College, Vanchuvanchery Padappai

Hospitals and healthcare facilities in and around Oragadam
 Parvathy Ortho Hospital, Jamunampattu Village
 Hiranandani Parks Hospital, Triveni Nagar
 Sayee Hospitals, Padappai
 Hoscons Medical Centre & Hospitals, Oragadam
 RMD Multispeciality Hospital - Amarambedu, Sriperumbudur, Backside of SIPCOT Irungatukotai
 Factor Healthcare, Nemili Road, Sriperumbudur
 Dr. Sivakumar Emergency Care Centre - Oragadam

References

Cities and towns in Kanchipuram district
Suburbs of Chennai